Raw and Rare is an album by The Von Bondies released in 2003 that consists mostly of live BBC radio recordings made in 2001 and 2002.

Track listing
All songs written by Jason Stollsteimer except where noted.

"Lack of Communication" – 3:31
"Nite Train" – 3:23
"Sound of Terror" – 3:20
"(Cassie) Going Down (On Marcie)" – 2:03
"It Came from Japan" – 2:07
"My Baby's Cryin'" – 2:31
"Cryin'" – 1:58
"R & R Nurse" (Yarber) – 5:13
"Please Please Man" – 1:59
"Vacant as a Ghost" – 2:18
"Save My Life" – 2:44
"Cryin'" – 1:53
"Take a Heart" (Sorrows, Stollsteimer) – 8:12
"Unknown" – 2:53 
"It Came from Japan" – 2:32

2003 albums
The Von Bondies albums